Anush Nikogosyan (born 7 July 1989) is an Armenian classical violinist.

Biography 
Aged five she got her first violin lessons and studied then with the Distinguished Teacher of Armenia Petros Haykazian and further at the Yerevan Komitas State Conservatory. For several years she has been taught by the principal conductor of the Armenian National Philharmonic Orchestra Eduard Topchjan. At the University of Music and Performing Arts Munich, she studied in the class of Prof. Christoph Poppen. Since 2013 Anush Nikoghosyan studies in the class of Prof. violinist Julia Fischer. She earned her Master-Degree in 2015 and is doing "Konzert-exam" since October 2015.

From 2001 to 2005 she was the scholarship holder of Vladimir Spivakov International Fund.

From 2012 to 2016 she was a scholarship holder of the Villa Musica chamber music Foundation.
As a soloist she has appeared with Deutsche Radio Philharmonie Saarbrücken, the Armenian National Philharmonic Orchestra, the Kärntner Sinfonieorchester, the Kurpfälzisches Kammerorchester Mannheim, Neuss Kammerakademie Orchestra, the Moravian Philharmonic Orchestra, the Kaunas Chamber Orchestra, the Armenian National Chamber Orchestra, the Ural Philharmonic Orchestra, and the Lithuanian National Philharmonic Orchestra under the baton of Christopher Warren-Green, Dmitri Liss, Leos Svarovsky, Christoph Poppen, Eduard Topchjan, Pavel Berman, Alexander Treger, Markus Bosch and other conductors. Anush has won prizes at numerous international violin competitions: in 2010 she became the 1st prize winner of the “International Kärntner Sparkasse Wörthersee” competition (Austria), after which she received many invitations, among them in July 2011, Anush was invited to play with "Pacific Music Festival Sapporo" Orchestra (Japan) as a soloist, in August 2014 she was invited to the Rimini Meeting Festival, the Festival della Nazioni in Citta di Castello, Ravello Music Festival (Italy), in October 2014 - the Brucknerfest (Austria), the Yerevan International Music Festival.

She played in concert halls: Alte Oper Frankfurt, Opéra de Nice, the Brucknerhaus Linz, the Konzerthaus Klagenfurt, Warsaw National Philharmonic Hall, the Aram Khachaturian Concert Hall Yerevan, the BASF Ludwigshafen Konzerthaus and others. In May 2015, she debuted at the Walt Disney Concert Hall in Los Angeles (USA). As a soloist Anush Nikoghosyan toured with various concerts in Armenia, Germany, Lithuania, Russia, United Kingdom, United Arab Emirates, Syria, China, Georgia, Italy, France, Czech Republic, Germany, Israel, the Netherlands, USA, Slovakia, Poland and Austria. As a chamber musician she regularly takes part in various festivals and she performed chamber music repertoire with such musicians as Julia Fischer, Kim Kashkashian, Nils Mönkemeyer, Sergei Krylov, Pavel Vernikov, Alexander Chaushyan, Mario Brunello, François-Frédéric Guy, Radovan Vlatkovic, Benjamin Nyffeneger.

She often performs works by contemporary composers, among them: Mansuryan, Yerkanyan,  Sharafyan, Zakaryan, Israelyan, Chaushian, Tschtschyan and many others.

Since 2013 Anush Nikoghosyan plays on a Guadagnini violin (Milan, 1753).

References

External links 
Anush Nikogosyan at the Armenian National Music website

1989 births
Living people
Musicians from Yerevan
Armenian classical violinists
21st-century Armenian women musicians
University of Music and Performing Arts Munich alumni
21st-century classical violinists
Women classical violinists